KZND-FM (94.7 FM, "94/7 Alternative Anchorage”) is a commercial radio station located in Houston, Alaska, broadcasting to the Anchorage, Alaska, area.  KZND airs an Alternative rock format. It is locally owned by Last Frontier Mediactive.  Its studios are located on Business Park Boulevard in midtown Anchorage, and its transmitter is located in Eagle River, Alaska.

History
KZND-FM originally signed on as KZND-LP in 1999 on 87.7 FM.  KZND-LP was a low power television station marketed as an FM radio broadcast station taking advantage of the fact that the audio of TV channel 6 can be heard on 87.7 FM.  On March 30, 2006, KZND-LP began to simulcast on 94.7 FM.  This significantly expanded the station's coverage area.

This simulcast also allowed the station to be included in the Arbitron ratings, as Arbitron does not rate LPTV stations.  Secondly, some radios cannot tune to 87.7 FM, so ownership hoped that a more "mainstream" frequency would bring in new listeners.

On August 1, 2014, KZND shifted their format to active rock, branded as "Pure Rock 94.7 KZND".

On February 2, 2018, KZND flipped formats to alternative rock, as "94.7 KZND - Alaska's Rock Alternative".

On March 8, 2019, Alaska Integrated Media sold sister station Rhythmic AC 105.7 KMVN and KZND to Robert and Tor Ingstad's Last Frontier Mediactive, a Fairbanks, Alaska-based radio company, for $1.25 million.  The sale was consummated on May 31, 2019.

In May 2019, the station reverted to its former imaging as “94.7 The End”, debuting a new logo in conjunction.

On June 17, 2019, KZND flipped to a current-based Alternative format, unveiling a new logo and website, and rebranding as “94/7 Alternative Anchorage”.

Previous logos

References

External links
KZND-FM official website
KZND Facebook page
KZND Twitter page
KZND Instagram page

ZND-FM
Alternative rock radio stations in the United States
Radio stations established in 2006